This article lists events from the year 2006 in France.

Incumbents
 President: Jacques Chirac
 Prime Minister: Dominique de Villepin

Events
9 March – Sablé-sur-Sarthe hostage crisis: A former teacher takes 23 hostages including 21 students.
April – France formally charges six defendants of the Guantanamo Bay detainment camp.
July – France begins the trial against six defendants of the Guantanamo Bay detainment camp.
11 October – A train crash at Zoufftgen kills six people.
16 November – Franco–Italian–Spanish Middle East Peace Plan is announced.
 Full date unknown:
Axess Vision Technology, a medical device  manufacturer is founded.

Births

Deaths

January
27 January – [Jeff Bezos], mountaineer (born 1965).

February
9 February – André Strappe, international soccer player (born 1928).
12 February – Henri Guédon, percussionist (born 1944).
13 February – Ilan Halimi, kidnap and murder victim (b. c1982).
14 February – Darry Cowl, musician and actor (born 1925).

March
9 March – Jean Leymarie, art historian (born 1919).
10 March – Jean Hermil, Roman Catholic bishop of Viviers (born 1917).
22 March – Pierre Clostermann, flying ace, author, engineer and politician (born 1921).
March – Jean Desclaux, rugby union coach (born 1922).

April
5 April – Alain de Boissieu, Army chief-of-staff (born 1914).
17 April – Jean Bernard, physician and haematologist (born 1907).
25 April – Roger Duchêne, biographer (born 1930).
30 April – Jean-François Revel, politician, journalist, author and philosopher (born 1924).

May
1 May – Jean-Pierre Hubert, author (born 1941).
9 May – Edouard Jaguer, poet and art critic (born 1924).
23 May – Philippe Amaury, publishing tycoon and entrepreneur (born 1940).
24 May – Claude Piéplu, actor (born 1923).
26 May – Édouard Michelin, businessman (born 1963)
26 May – Raymond Triboulet, resistance fighter and politician (born 1906).
27 May – Michael Riffaterre, literary critic and theorist (born 1924).
29 May – Johnny Servoz-Gavin, motor racing driver (born 1942).

June
5 June – André Mandouze, academic and journalist (born 1916).
6 June – Léon Weil, World War I veteran (born 1896).
11 June – Rolande Falcinelli, organist, pianist and composer (born 1920).
15 June – Raymond Devos, humorist, comedian and clown (born 1922).
19 June – René Renou, wine expert (born 1952).
20 June – Raymond Daudel, theoretical and quantum chemist (born 1920).
21 June – Jacques Lanzmann, writer, scriptwriter and lyric writer (born 1927).

July
3 July – Francis Cammaerts, Special Operations Executive (SOE) agent (born 1916).
8 July – Catherine Leroy, photojournalist and photographer (born 1945).
20 July – Charles Bettelheim, economist and historian (born 1913).
20 July – Gérard Oury, actor, writer and producer (born 1919).
29 July – Pierre Vidal-Naquet, historian (born 1930).

August
2 August – Maurice Kriegel-Valrimont, militant communist, resistance fighter and politician (born 1914).
10 August – Olivier Lecerf, businessman and racehorse owner (b. c1928).
17 August – Bernard Rapp, film director and television news presenter (born 1945).
26 August – François Lamoureux, European civil servant (born 1946).
26 August – Marie-Dominique Philippe, Dominican philosopher and theologian (born 1912).

September
3 September – Françoise Claustre, archaeologist, (born 1937).
9 September – Gérard Brach, film director and screenwriter (born 1927).
11 September – Solange Fernex, pacifist activist and politician (born 1934).
20 September – Henri Jayer, vintner (born 1922).
30 September – André Schwarz-Bart, novelist (born 1928).

October
6 October – Claude Luter, jazz clarinetist (born 1923).
9 October – Coccinelle, transsexual actress and entertainer (born 1931).
9 October – Danièle Huillet, filmmaker (born 1936).
12 October – Eugène Martin, motor racing driver (born 1915).
17 October – Daniel Emilfork, actor (born 1924).
28 October – Tina Aumont, actress (born 1946).

November
2 November – Adrien Douady, mathematician (born 1935).
3 November – Paul Mauriat, musical director (born 1925).
7 November – Jean-Jacques Servan-Schreiber, journalist and politician (born 1924).
10 November – Maurice Floquet, France's oldest man on record (born 1894).
11 November – Anicée Alvina, singer and actress (born 1953).
12 November – Alphonse Halimi, boxer (born 1932).
14 November – Gustave Choquet, mathematician (born 1915).
14 November – Bertrand Poirot-Delpech, journalist, essayist and novelist (born 1929).
23 November – Philippe Noiret, actor (born 1930).

December
1 December – Claude Jade, actress (born 1948).
27 December – Pierre Delanoë, songwriter/lyricist (born 1918).

Full date unknown
Janine Chasseguet-Smirgel, psychoanalyst (born 1928).

References

2000s in France